Van Horn may refer to:

People
 Arthur W. Van Horn (1860–1931), American architect
 Bruce Van Horn, American poker player
 Buddy Van Horn (1929–2021), American stuntman and film director
 Burt Van Horn (1823–1896), U.S. Representative from New York
 Carl van Horn, American auto racer
 Christian Van Horn (born 1978), American opera singer and Richard Tucker Award winner
 Darrin Van Horn (born 1968), American boxer
 Dave van Horn (born 1960), American baseball coach
 Doug Van Horn (born 1944), American football player who was an offensive lineman in the National Football League

 George Van Horn (1850–1904), U.S. Representative from New York
 Keith Van Horn (born 1975), American basketball player
 Lucretia Van Horn (1882–1970), American artist
 Nicholas van Hoorn, Dutch pirate
 Noel Van Horn (born 1968), American comics artist and writer for Disney comics, son of William Van Horn
 Patrick Van Horn (born 1969), American actor
 Richard L. Van Horn (born 1932), American academic
 Robert T. Van Horn (1824–1916), American newspaper publisher, politician
 Russell van Horn (1885–1970), American boxer
 Welby Van Horn (born 1920), American tennis player and coach
 William Van Horn (born 1939), American comics artist and writer for Disney comics, father of Noel Van Horn

Places in the United States
 Van Horn, Texas
 Van Horn, Washington
 Van Horn High School (Missouri)
 Van Horn High School (Texas)
 South Van Horn, Alaska, a census-designated place
 Van Horn Road

See also
Van Hoorn (surname)
Van Horne (disambiguation)
Van der Hoorn, a surname

Dutch-language surnames